Bronte Beach is a small but popular recreational beach in the Eastern Suburbs of Sydney, Australia. It is a division of the LGA of Waverley Council. Bronte Beach is 2 kilometres south of Bondi Beach and north of the much larger Coogee Beach.  

A long distance ocean swimming event is held every December between Bondi Beach and Bronte.  The three beaches are linked by a paved coastal footpath along the rocky cliff tops, much frequented by tourists and local runners and walkers.  The beach is popular with surfers and despite the non rough surf, less abled swimmers can avail themselves of the bogey hole or rock pool towards the southern end of the beach.  At the south end of the beach is a 30-metre ocean pool, one of the best known in Sydney. Also directly opposite from Bronte there are some popular cafes.

History 

The size of the sandy area of the beach is far less than it was prior to 1914 when a promenade and sea wall were constructed. A functional storm water drain emptying near to the bogey hole was built in 1918. During heavy wave conditions in 1961 six children swimming in the bogey hole were washed back into the pipes. All six were safely rescued by Waverley Council Life Guards and Bronte lifesavers who had to crawl up into the pipes following the two branches. On the Northern end near to a stairway there is a naturally formed, large sandstone cave. This shady sheltered cave may have been used by the local indigenous people.

Naming of Bronte Beach 

Contrary to the popular misconception that Bronte Beach was named after the Brontë sisters, or Bronte House, Bronte Beach was in fact named after the British military figure Vice-Admiral Horatio Nelson, Duke of Bronté. 

Horatio Nelson was awarded the title of the Duke of Bronte from the King of Naples in 1799 and from that time signed his name as "Nelson and Bronte".  Originally Bronte Beach was known as Nelson Bay and continues as the name of the bay fronting the beach. There are other references to Vice-Admiral Horatio Nelson, Duke of Bronte in the area, specifically the naming of Trafalgar Street, Nelson Avenue and Bronte Road. In 1957 the name Bronte for the suburb was first used in advertisements for the sale of land known as the Bronte Estate.

Surf Life Saving 

There is a very dangerous rip at Bronte Beach known as the Bronte Express.

The beach is patrolled by Waverley Council full-time lifeguards on a daily basis (except during winter) and volunteer lifesavers from the life saving club on weekends and public holidays.

It is home to Bronte Surf Lifesaving Club and is the oldest such organisation in the world, having been formed in 1903. The idea of having able swimmers patrol the beach thereby making swimming safer was developed by John Bond.

A public park adjoins the beach, with provision of picnic seats and barbecue hotplates, although parking is limited and restrictions are strictly enforced.  The beach is served by the 379 bus from Bondi Junction station.  The beach is shaded by hills to the west and tends to become cool, windy and deserted towards the end of the afternoon.

The beach is widely represented in literature. Sylvia in Kathleen Stewart's Spilt Milk (1995) regularly walks the cliffs. Poets have often found voice on its sands.

Surfer Jessi Miley-Dyer is from Bronte Beach.

Artist Caleb Reid is from Bronte beach.

In popular culture

 In 2009, they filmed live-action segments featuring children in Hi-5.

References

External links

The Book of Sydney Suburbs, Compiled by Frances Pollen, Angus & Robertson Publishers, 1990, Published in Australia 
"Sand in our Souls - the Beach in Australian History" Leone Huntsman, MUP, 2001
Guide to Sydney Beaches
 Bronte Surf Club

Tourist attractions in Sydney
Beaches of New South Wales
Surfing locations in New South Wales
Bronte, New South Wales